Yinka, Where Is Your Huzband? is a novel written by Nigerian novelist Lizzie Damilola Blackburn. The novel which is her debut novel was first published by Pamela Dorman Books an imprint of Penguin Random House in 2022.

Plot 

The novel revolves around Yinka; a British-Nigerian Oxford graduate who is being pressured into getting married.

Development 
The novel began as a short story in a blog called Christian based dilemma which Blackburn ran. She was in her 20's, she was pressured by her mother to settle down, then she decided to write a story about it. The short story developed in a novel when she met Jackie Lau in a blogging workshop.

Reception 

Kristen Stewart of Library Journal described it as "... a sensitive, humorous chronicle of a young woman/'s journey of self-discovery ... This universal story of a young woman coming into her own contains many elements of Nigerian culture ... Readers who like the novels of Marian Keyes and Cecelia Ahern will find much to enjoy here."  Alicia Rancilio of Associated Press described it as funny and big-hearted. She further stated that "Yinka, Where is Your Huzband? is more than a book about a woman looking for a man. It addresses themes such as female friendships, Black beauty standards and religion."

References 

2022 Nigerian novels
Nigerian romance novels
Pamela Dorman Books books